At the 1906 Summer Olympics in Athens, six rowing events were contested.   Now called the Intercalated Games, the 1906 Games are no longer considered as an official Olympic Games by the International Olympic Committee.

Medal summary

Medal table

References

1906 Intercalated Games events
1906
1906 in rowing
Rowing competitions in Greece